This is a list of Italian football transfers from the summer of 2018 that featured at least one Serie A or Serie B club. The transfer window of Serie A was opened from 1 July 2018 to 17 August 2018, despite some contracts were already signed before the window. Moreover, the international incoming transfer window stayed open from 1 July until 25 August. Free agent could join any club at any time.

Transfers
Legend
Those clubs in Italic indicate that the player already left the team on loan on this or the previous season or new signing that immediately left the club

February–May

June

July

August

September

Footnotes

References
General

 

Specific

Summer transfers
2018
Italian